Wang Meng (born December 10, 1991  in Jilin) is a Chinese ice dancer. He currently competes with partner Zou Bingxin. With former partner Guan Xueting, he is the 2008 Chinese silver medalist and had placed 19th at the 2008 World Junior Figure Skating Championships. He previously competed with Su Yingying.

Competitive highlights
(with Zou)

(with Guan)

References

External links

 Tracings.net profile

1991 births
Living people
Chinese male ice dancers
Sportspeople from Jilin City
Figure skaters from Jilin
Competitors at the 2011 Winter Universiade